Dimitar Dimitrov is a Bulgarian male curler and coach.

Record as a coach of national teams

References

External links

Living people
Bulgarian male curlers
Bulgarian curling coaches
Year of birth missing (living people)